The 2021 Internazionali di Tennis Città di Verona was a professional tennis tournament played on clay courts. It was the first edition of the tournament which was part of the 2021 ATP Challenger Tour. It took place in Verona, Italy, between 16 and 22 August 2021.

Singles main draw entrants

Seeds

 1 Rankings as of 9 August 2021.

Other entrants
The following players received wildcards into the singles main draw:
  Marco Bortolotti
  Fletcher Scott
  Giulio Zeppieri

The following player received entry into the singles main draw as a special exempt:
  Orlando Luz

The following player received entry into the singles main draw as an alternate:
  Filippo Baldi

The following players received entry from the qualifying draw:
  Nerman Fatić
  Francesco Forti
  Matija Pecotić
  Matheus Pucinelli de Almeida

Champions

Singles 

  Holger Rune def.  Nino Serdarušić 6–4, 6–2.

Doubles 

  Sadio Doumbia /  Fabien Reboul def.  Luca Margaroli /  Gonçalo Oliveira 7–5, 4–6, [10–6].

References

Internazionali di Tennis Città di Verona
Internazionali di Tennis Città di Verona
August 2021 sports events in Italy